The Journal of Modern Literature is a quarterly peer-reviewed literary journal covering studies of literature in any language produced after 1900. It was established in 1977 at Temple University; since 1996, it has been published  by Indiana University Press, who purchased the journal in 2000.

Abstracting and indexing 
The journal is abstracted and indexed by:
 MLA Bibliography
 EBSCO databases
 ProQuest databases
 Humanities Index

References

External links 
 

Literary magazines published in the United States
Indiana University Press academic journals
Quarterly journals
English-language journals
Publications established in 1977